Spioenkop Dam impounds the Tugela River in KwaZulu-Natal. It is located within a nature reserve by the same name. Spion Kop (hill) is located 2.5 km to the north of the dam.

See also
Spioenkop Dam Nature Reserve
Tugela River

References

Dams in South Africa
Tugela River
Dams completed in 1972